Ivan Vyacheslavovich Donskov (born 17 October 1997) is a Russian football player.

Club career
He made his debut in the Russian Football National League for FC Irtysh Omsk on 1 August 2020 in a game against FC Yenisey Krasnoyarsk, he substituted Kirill Morozov in the 53rd minute.

References

External links
 
 Profile by Russian Football National League
 

1997 births
Sportspeople from Rostov-on-Don
Living people
Russian footballers
Association football forwards
FC Irtysh Omsk players
FC SKA Rostov-on-Don players
FC Nosta Novotroitsk players
FC Chayka Peschanokopskoye players
Russian First League players
Russian Second League players